The following is a list of county roads in Osceola County, Florida.  All county roads are maintained by the county in which they reside.

County routes in Osceola County

References

FDOT Map of Osceola County 
FDOT GIS data, accessed January 2014

 
County